Famelica bitrudis is a species of sea snail, a marine gastropod mollusk in the family Raphitomidae.

Description
The length of the shell attains 15.2 mm, its diameter 3.4 mm.

Distribution
This marine species occurs off South Africa.

References

 Barnard, K. H. 1963, Deep sea Moliusca from west of Cape Point, South Africa. Annals of the South African Museum 46:407-452.

External links
 Biolib.cz: image
 
 Sysoev, A.V., 1996. Taxonomic notes on South African Deep-Sea Conoidean Gastropods (Gastropoda: Conoidea) described by K.H. Barnard, 1963 . Nautilus1, 110:22-29

Endemic fauna of South Africa
bitrudis
Gastropods described in 1963